Ann Susan Gibson now Sue Robson (born 1955) is an alpine skier from New Zealand.

In the 1976 Winter Olympics at Innsbruck, she came 
38th in the Downhill, 19th in the Slalom (the best placing for the New Zealand alpine skiers), and 42nd in the Giant Slalom.

References

External links 
 
 

Living people
1955 births
New Zealand female alpine skiers
Olympic alpine skiers of New Zealand
Alpine skiers at the 1976 Winter Olympics
20th-century New Zealand women